The 1987–88 FIBA European Cup Winners' Cup was the twenty-second edition of FIBA's 2nd-tier level European-wide professional club basketball competition, contested between national domestic cup champions, running from 22 September 1987, to 16 March 1988. It was contested by 20 teams, one more than in the previous edition.

Limoges CSP won the competition, defeating Ram Joventut in the final, which was held in the Palais des Sports, of Grenoble.

Participants

First round

|}

Second round

|}

Quarterfinals

Semifinals

|}

Final
March 16, Palais des Sports, Grenoble

|}

References

External links
 1987–88 FIBA European Cup Winner's Cup @ linguasport.com
FIBA European Cup Winner's Cup 1987–88

FIBA
FIBA Saporta Cup